Nokha Assembly constituency may refer to 

 Nokha, Bihar Assembly constituency
 Nokha, Rajasthan Assembly constituency